Little D is the fourth album by Fishboy. The album is a tribute to the city of Denton, Texas (from whose nickname the album gets its name), and features current and former Denton-based artists like Paul Slavens, Corn Mo, Chris Flemmons (of the Baptist Generals), and Howard Draper (formerly of Shearwater).

Track listing
 Intro (for Your Answering Machine)
 Cheer Up, Great Pumpkin
 That's a...Jellyfish
 Quatro
 Our Escape
 Banana Trees
 Tree Star
 Water Works
 Asian Grain
 Gameboy
 A Surprise Return
 Kichijoji
 Start Again (A Story of Two Feuding Denton, TX Neighbors)
 Haunted Highway- Written by Jade Jenkins, at age 11.

2007 albums
Fishboy (band) albums